Lars Gustaf Oscar Dansk (born 28 February 1994) is a Swedish ice hockey goaltender currently under contract with the Calgary Flames of the National Hockey League (NHL). Dansk was drafted by the Columbus Blue Jackets at the 2012 NHL Entry Draft with the 31st overall pick, the first pick of the second round. He was the starting goaltender for the Swedish national junior team at the 2014 World Junior Ice Hockey Championships.

Playing career
On 8 May 2014, Dansk was signed to a three-year entry-level contract by the Blue Jackets. 

After his first full season in North America, playing with affiliates, the Springfield Falcons and the Kalamazoo Wings in the American Hockey League and ECHL respectively Dansk returned to the Swedish Hockey League for the second season of his contract, on a one-year loan agreement with Rögle BK on 23 May 2015.

At the conclusion of his entry-level contract with the Blue Jackets, he was not tendered an offer as a restricted free agent on 26 June 2017. On 3 July, he signed a one-year, two-way contract with the NHL expansion team, the Vegas Golden Knights. He was re-assigned to begin the 2017–18 season with AHL affiliate, the Chicago Wolves. After just one game with the Wolves he was recalled to the injury-hit Golden Knights on 20 October 2017. The following day, Dansk made his NHL debut playing in the final 14 minutes and recorded his first NHL victory in a 3–2 overtime decision over the St. Louis Blues after he replaced Malcolm Subban, who was injured in the third period. As the Golden Knights temporary first choice goaltender, he then won his first NHL start making 29 saves on 31 shots in a 4–2 victory over the Chicago Blackhawks on 24 October 2017. He then got his first NHL shutout in a 7–0 win against the Colorado Avalanche, he made 32 saves in that game, also marking the first recorded shutout in the history of the Golden Knights franchise.

His success was short-lived, as he was injured on 30 October 2017 and was replaced by Maxime Lagacé. When cleared to play again, he was immediately reassigned to the Wolves on 24 January 2018.

Dansk played within the Golden Knights organization for four years before leaving as a free agent following the 2020–21 season. Halting his North American career, Dansk signed a two-year contract with Russian club, HC Spartak Moscow of the KHL, on 5 July 2021.

On July 13, 2022, Dansk returned to North America as a free agent and was signed to a one-year, two-way contract with the Calgary Flames.

Career statistics

Regular season and playoffs

International

Awards and honours

Personal life
Dansk and his wife share homes in both Vancouver, BC and Stockholm, Sweden. 

The couple wed in 2021.

References

External links

1994 births
Living people
Calgary Wranglers players
Chicago Wolves players
Columbus Blue Jackets draft picks
Erie Otters players
Kalamazoo Wings (ECHL) players
Rögle BK players
HC Spartak Moscow players
Springfield Falcons players
Swedish ice hockey goaltenders
Vegas Golden Knights players
Ice hockey people from Stockholm